The 2015 Runnymede Borough Council election took place on 7 May 2015 to elect one third of members to Runnymede Borough Council in England. The election coincided with other local elections held simultaneously with a General Election and resulted in increased turnout compared to the election four years before.  In Addlestone North a by-election added to seats vacant. All currently drawn wards of the United Kingdom in this area are three-member, with the different members' seats contested three years out of four.

Results
Conservatives gained a seat, adding to councillors within the group with overall control of the Council.

Ward by ward

References

2015 English local elections
May 2015 events in the United Kingdom
2015
2010s in Surrey